Selam Professor Shonku (Hats off, Professor Shonku) is a Professor Shonku series book written by Satyajit Ray  and published by Ananda Publishers in 1995. Ray wrote these stories about Professor Shanku for Bengali magazines Sandesh and Anandamela. This book is a collection of seven Shonku stories.

Stories
 Nefrudet er Samadhi (Sandesh, Autumn, 1986),
 Dr. Danieli'r Abishkar (Sandesh, Autumn 1988),
 Shonku o Frankenstein (Anandamela, Autumn 1988),
 Don Christobaldi'r Bhabishyadbani (Anandamela, Autumn 1989),
 Swarnaparnee (Anandamela, Autumn 1990),
 Intelectron (Anandamela, Autumn 1992),
 Dreksel Island er Ghatana (Anandamela, Autumn 1992)

See also
Shabash Professor Shonku
Punashcha Professor Shonku
Professor Shonkur Kandokarkhana

References

1995 books
Science fiction short stories
Professor Shonku